Francisco Alam Atura (born 1 August 1979) is a Palestinian former professional footballer who played at both professional and international levels as a defender.

Career
Atura spent his entire professional career in Chile, playing with Santiago Wanderers, Unión La Calera and Unión San Felipe.

Atura earned 24 caps for the Palestinian national side between 2002 and 2006, appearing in five FIFA World Cup qualifying matches.

References

1979 births
Living people
Chilean people of Palestinian descent
Palestinian footballers
Palestine international footballers
Association football defenders